"Angel" is a song by English trip hop group Massive Attack, featuring the vocals and songwriting from Horace Andy, and is partially based on Andy's song "You Are My Angel". It was released as the third single from their third studio album, Mezzanine (1998), on 13 July 1998. "Angel" peaked at number 30 on the UK Singles Chart.

Background and composition

Daddy G, who was the main songwriter on it (along with 3D), described the song as "[starting] something we've got to finish. It was a much bigger thing than any member of the band." The song samples The Incredible Bongo Band song "Last Bongo in Belgium".

Music video
The music video for "Angel", directed by Walter A. Stern, features Grant "Daddy G" Marshall in a car park. He is walking to the exit when Robert del Naja, Andrew Vowles and Horace Andy appear behind him. They gradually get closer to him, causing him to feel intimidated. More and more people start following him, which causes him to run outside the car park until he reaches a fence and therefore cannot go any further. As he turns to face the people chasing him, they stop and face him. He then notices that they seem to be mirroring his movements, as if his body controls them. He suddenly charges towards the people that followed him, which causes them to run away.

The video has had over 47 million views on YouTube (as of November 2022).

Critical reception
Reception for the song was positive. Amy Hanson of AllMusic describes the song thus: "While the beat here is slow, druggy, and deep, what ultimately drives Angel is the wall of guitars that are reminiscent of a very early Cure".

Track listing

Personnel
Massive Attack
 Robert Del Naja – producer, arrangements, programming, keyboards, samples, art direction
 Grantley Marshall – producer, arrangements, programming, keyboards, guitars, samples
 Andrew Vowles – producer, arrangements, programming, samples, percussions

Additional personnel
 Neil Davidge – producer, arrangements, programming, keyboards, samples
 Horace Andy – vocals
 Angelo Bruschini – guitars
 Jon Harris, Bob Locke, Winston Blisset – bass guitars
 Andy Gangadeen – drums
 Dave Jenkins, Michael Timothy – additional keyboards

Recording personnel
 Jan Kybert – Pro Tools
 Lee Shepherd – engineer (Massive Attack and Christchurch Studios)
 Mark "Spike" Stent – mixing (Olympic Studios)
 Jan Kybert, Paul "P-Dub" Walton – assistant mixing
 Tim Young – editing, engineer (Metropolis Studios)

In popular culture
Featured in the 1998 episode "Off Profile" of the series La Femme Nikita.
Used repeatedly in the 1999 film Best Laid Plans starring Reese Witherspoon and Josh Brolin.
Used in commercials made by Adidas during the 1998 FIFA World Cup.
Used in 1998 film Pi when Max's landlord is interrogating him. 
Used in 1999 film Go when Ronna goes to buy Ecstasy off Todd.
Used in the 2000 film Snatch during the caravan park fire scene.
Used in the 2001 film Antitrust when Milo is being served dinner by Alice (Rebecca).
Used in the intro of the 2002 relaunch of Top Gear's first series.
Featured in the 2003 episode "Commencement" of the series The West Wing.
An instrumental track based on the song was used as the title theme in the 2004 game Vampire: The Masquerade – Bloodlines.
It was used in Far Cry 2 E3 2008 trailer.
In the 2005 psychological thriller Stay, "Angel" was used in a strip club scene.
The song was used in the 2004 movie Flight of the Phoenix, in a tense standoff scene between the main characters and a band of smugglers.
Used in the Pilot episode of Person of Interest, during a standoff inside an apartment building.
Used in the opening credits of the movie "Firewall" (2006) with Harrison Ford
Featured in the 2012 episode "Island of Dreams" of the series Grimm
"Angel" has been covered by mathcore band The Dillinger Escape Plan, for their iTunes only EP, Plagiarism, and also by Brazilian metal band Sepultura on their EP Revolusongs and on the special edition of their 2003 album Roorback. Sepultura's cover was featured in the second episode of the Fox series The Following. It has also been covered live by Australian psychedelic group Tame Impala and Norwegian progressive metal band Leprous, which released their version as a single in 2019.
Featured in the opening credits of Brazilian telenovela Verdades Secretas.
The song was used in the Hugo Boss perfume of men by the actor "Ryan Reynolds" in 2009
The song was used in the E3 2018 Gameplay Trailer for Metro Exodus.
Used in an episode of Third Watch
Featured in first episode of Season 2 of Good Girls.
Featured in season 7 episode 6 "All or Nothing" of Burn Notice
Featured in the ads of Watchmen
Used in Balenciaga Spring/Summer 2018 fashion show opening theme
Used in the 2021 play 2:22 A Ghost Story
Used in the TV series Secret Truths 2015

Charts

Certifications

References

Massive Attack songs
1998 songs
Virgin Records singles
1998 singles
Songs written by Robert Del Naja
Songs written by Andrew Vowles
Songs written by Daddy G
Songs written by Horace Andy
Industrial rock songs
Music videos directed by Walter Stern